The 1954 Oregon gubernatorial election took place on November 2, 1954. Republican incumbent Paul L. Patterson defeated Democratic nominee Joseph K. Carson to win the election. Earl T. Newbry unsuccessfully sought the Republican nomination.

Election results

References

Gubernatorial
1954
Oregon
November 1954 events in the United States